"Satellite" is the second single from American rock band Starset's second album, Vessels, after first single "Monster". "Satellite" was released as a single in August 2017, and peaked at number 12 on the Billboard Mainstream Rock Songs chart.

Background
The song is the second track, and second single from Starset's second album Vessels. The song was debuted three days prior to the album's January 20, 2017, release date, through Marvel's website in a story detailing the future collaboration of the company with the band to create a supplementary graphic novel about the album. The song was released as a single in August 2017, and has peaked at number 12 on the Billboard Mainstream Rock Songs chart as of November 2017. The band performed the song live in October 2017 at the Loudwire Music Awards.

Themes and composition
The song's sound has been compared to the work of the bands Attack Attack! and 30 Seconds to Mars due to its "processed vocals and huge synth hooks". The song has dense, layered singing, combining heavy guitar, keyboard, synthesizers, and violins. Loudwire noted that the track would make a good single due to its "synth-driven, infinitely listenable melodic lamentations on the desire for connection, with Bates begging, 'Satellite are you here tonight? / Shine your light and set me free'". Multiple reviewers noted it as a standout track of the album.

Personnel
 Dustin Bates – lead vocals, guitars
 Brock Richards – lead guitar
 Ron DeChant – bass
 Adam Gilbert – drums

Charts

References

2017 songs
2017 singles
Razor & Tie singles
Starset songs